The Texas law of parties states that a person can be criminally responsible for the actions of another in certain circumstances, including "[i]f in the attempt to carry out a conspiracy to commit one felony, another felony is committed by one of the conspirators, all conspirators are guilty of the felony actually committed, though having no intent to commit it, if the offense was committed in furtherance of the unlawful purpose and was one that should have been anticipated as a result of the carrying out of the conspiracy."

In Texas capital cases, a person may be convicted under the law of parties, but may not be sentenced to death if convicted under the law of parties unless the sentencing jury finds beyond a reasonable doubt that "the defendant actually caused the death of the deceased or did not actually cause the death of the deceased but intended to kill the deceased or another or anticipated that a human life would be taken."

On May 5, 2021, the Texas House of Representatives voted 135 to 6 on a bill that limits death penalty eligibility under the law of parties. The bill intends to promote individual culpability and limit the power of the state to execute someone not directly responsible for a crime. As of 2023, the bill is yet to be approved by the Texas Senate.

Convictions under the law 
People convicted under the law include Clinton Lee Young, Jeffery Lee Wood, John Adams, Joseph Nichols, Kenneth Foster, Miguel Angel Martinez, Patrick Murphy Jr., Randy Halprin, Ray Jasper,  Robert Lee Thompson, Robert Lynn Pruett, Steven Michael Woods Jr. and Thomas Bartlett Whitaker. Foster, Martinez and Whitaker's sentences would later be commuted to life imprisonment. Young was released on bond in January 2022 after his conviction was overturned in September 2021.

See also 
Collective punishment
Felony murder rule (Texas)
Lists of people executed in Texas

References 

1973 legislation
Texas statutes
U.S. state criminal legislation